SC Olympia Radotín is a football club located in the Radotín district of Prague, Czech Republic. They played in the fifth tier of the Czech football system. The club won the Prague Championship in 2011, but refused promotion, so the B team of FK Dukla Prague went up to the Czech Fourth Division in their place, as league runners-up for the season. In 2018, the club merged with FK Olympia Prague during that club's relocation to Radotín and rebranding to SC Olympia Radotín.

Honours
Prague Championship (fifth tier)
 Champions 2010–11

References

External links
 Official website 
 SC Radotín at the website of the Prague Football Association 

Olympia Radotín
Football clubs in the Czech Republic
Football clubs in Prague
Association football clubs established in 1922
1922 establishments in Czechoslovakia